Kali Ghata (transliteration: Black Cloud) is a 1980 Hindi romantic thriller film produced and directed by Ved Rahi,the film stars Shashi Kapoor, Rekha, Danny Denzongpa in lead roles, with Aruna Irani, Lalita Pawar, Jagdeep, Nazir Hussain, A. K. Hangal in supporting roles. The music was composed by Laxmikant-Pyarelal, with lyrics written by Anand Bakshi.

Plot
Rai Bahadur Satpal Singh (Nazir Hussain) is killed cold-blooded in a remote village. He is survived by his twin daughters Rekha and Rashmi (both played by Rekha).

Rekha manages their business with the help of their chief estate manager Diwan (A. K. Hangal), along with his son and factory manager Kishore (Danny Denzongpa). Rashmi and Kishore are in love with each other which displeases Rekha, who sends Rashmi abroad to attend a painting course. On the other hand, Rekha too is disinterested about her marriage.

Meanwhile, driving through their estate, Rekha's car breaks down and is helped by Prem (Shashi Kapoor), with a golden hand for such machines. After few meets, both fall in love with each other. After a few days, Rekha announces her engagement with Prem to the surprise of everyone around. She also wills to assign the entire estate to Rashmi before engagement. During the engagement, when Rekha's Police Inspector friend Vikas shows up to wish the couple good luck for the occasion, Prem is suspiciously found missing. The next evening, the couple go out to spend private time on a house-boat anchored in a lake on their estate.

Later in the stormy night, Rekha finds Prem missing from the boat and starts looking for him. While searching, someone pushes her in the lake, but not before Rekha glimpses the shadow of this person. Everyone at the estate is surprised with the news of Rekha's death. Meanwhile, she survives and reaches the house of her friend Pinky (Aruna Irani). Once there, Rekha learns about Rashmi's arrival for Rekha's funeral and both plan to investigate the incident.

On the other hand, Kishore, Prem and the Police too start their investigation separately to unmask the killer. Meanwhile, when Rashmi (Rekha disguised herself) meets him, Prem discloses the intense love for Rekha. She finds quite a few on her suspect list. Kishore, who is willing to go to any extent to marry Rashmi. Prem, for his suspicious movements. The staff at their estate, like the cook (Jagdeep), house keeper Amba (Lalita Pawar) et al. The story progresses and after a few thrilling sequences, the murderer is revealed in the climax.

Cast
Shashi Kapoor as Prem
Rekha as Rekha / Rashmi (Double Role)
Danny Denzongpa as Kishore
Aruna Irani as Pinky
A. K. Hangal as Diwan
Jagdeep as Cook
Nazir Hussain as Rai Bahadur Satpal Singh
Lalita Pawar as Amba
Raj Mehra as CBI Inspector
Pinchoo Kapoor as Prem's Father
Urmila Bhatt as Prem's Mother

Crew
Direction – Ved Rahi
Story – Ved Rahi
Production – Ved Rahi
Production Company – Shivalik Pictures
Editing – Subhash Gupta
Cinematography – Kay Gee
Art Direction – Sudhendu Roy
Choreography – Kiran Kumar, Oscar, Robert, Suresh Bhatt, Vijay
Music Direction – Laxmikant Pyarelal
Lyrics – Anand Bakshi
Playback – Asha Bhosle, Hemlata, Lata Mangeshkar, Mohammad Rafi

Soundtrack
Lyrics: Anand Bakshi

References

External links 
 

1980s Hindi-language films
Films scored by Laxmikant–Pyarelal